Denise Deegan (born 1966 in County Cork , Ireland) is an Irish screenwriter and author of contemporary fictional and drama novels for adults and teens. She is currently adapting her teen series The Butterfly Novels for film. In 2012 she was nominated for the 2012 Irish Book Awards in the Young Adult category for her book And For Your Information... She worked as a nurse in Vincent's Hospital for 4 years and currently resides in County Dublin with her husband and two children.

Bibliography

The Butterfly Novels
And By The Way... (2011)
And For Your Information... (2011)
And Actually... (2012)

Fiction
Turning Turtle (1990)
Time In A Bottle (2004)
Love Comes Tumbling (2006)
Do You Want What I Want (2007)
For Charlie... (2012)

References

External links
 
 The Butterfly Effect: Denise Deegan at Writing.ie
 This much I know: Denise Deegan

1966 births
Irish women novelists
Living people